Sophus Carl Frederik Torup (15 August 1861 – 30 November 1937) was a Danish physiologist who settled in Norway. 

He was born in Nykøbing in Falster, Denmark, to Jacob Møller Torup and Gregerssine Juliane Marie Simonsen. He was appointed professor in physiology at the University of Oslo from 1889 to 1931. Among his research interests were hematology and nutrition.  He made contributed as advicor to polar expeditions, and the Torupa Island, adjacent to Karl-Alexander Island in Franz Josef Land, is named after Torup. He was decorated Knight, First Class of the Order of St. Olav in 1900, and was Commander of the Order of Dannebrog.

References

1861 births
1937 deaths
People from Falster
People from Guldborgsund Municipality
Danish physiologists
Danish emigrants to Norway
Norwegian physiologists
Academic staff of the University of Oslo
Commanders of the Order of the Dannebrog